The 2013 World Yo-Yo Contest was the culminating yo-yo competition of the worldwide competitive circuit. The winners from this competition in any of the six championship divisions were deemed the current World Yo-Yo Champion until the 2014 World Champions were crowned. The competition was run by Gregory Cohen with the International Yo-Yo Federation (IYYF). The competition took place at the Rozen Plaza Hotel in Orlando, Florida, USA from August 8–10, 2013.

History
The first World Yo-Yo Contest was held in London, England, in 1932. The winner was Harvey Lowe. The contest was not held annually until 1992, when Dale Oliver started one in Montreal, Canada during that year's annual International Jugglers' Association's (IJA) convention. The contest was held during this convention until 1999, when it was held in Hawaii. The 2000 contest was held at Universal Studios in Orlando, but in 2001, the event moved to the Rosen Plaza Hotel, where it was held annually until 2013 by Gregory Cohen, owner and operator of YoYoGuy and Infinite Illusions. After the 2013 contest, an international coalition (the IYYF) was formed to organize a new, rotating contest which will be held in a different venue/country every year.

Championship divisions 
The World Yo-Yo Contest has 6 championship divisions that award the title of "World Yo-Yo Champion".

Championship division structure
There are a series of preliminary rounds before the final round at the World Yo-Yo Contest. Competitors were allowed a one-minute routine, and a set number of players would make the finals.

In the 1A division, there were three rounds of competition. In 2A-5A, there was only the Preliminary (1 minute) and the Final (3 minute). Only those who meet these requirements can enter the rounds.
 Preliminary (1 minute): Top 10 at a sanctioned National Competition/Multi-National Competition seeded directly to Preliminary, and top performing competitors from Wild-Card

 Semi-Final (1:30 minutes): Top-3 at sanctioned Multi-National Competition & sanctioned National Champions seeded directly to Semi-Final Top performing competitors from Preliminary

 Final (3 minutes): Previous Year's World Champion seeded directly to Final; Top performing competitors from Semi-Final; Sanctioned National Champions

Champions

1A 

Hungary's Janos Karancz became the first European to win the 1A division at the World Yo-Yo Contest. 2013 was also the first, and only, year to feature a top-3 in 1A with no players from Japan or the United States.

2A 
Following Shu Takada's 2012 World Title in the 2A division, 2013 was set up as a rematch between Takuma Yamamoto and Shu Takada. Yamamoto's secured his second World Title, his first in 2008. Japan, once again, swept the top three with Ryu Yamashita taking third.

3A 
Following a win at the 2012 US National Yo-Yo Competition, Patrick Borgerding came into the 3A finals. He challenged two-time defending champion Hank Freeman, but fell short. Hank Freeman completed a routine with only two minor mistakes—a record for the division—and secured his third consecutive World Title.

4A 
Every player had at least one major deduction. After defending champion Rei Iwakura got thirteen major deductions, Michael Nakamura to take the World Title. Chun Hin Chan became the first player outside of the United States or Japan to finish top-3 in the 4A division.

5A 
Takeshi Matsuura came in first place, earning his fifth world title in the 5A division. In second place was 2007 5A World Champion Tyler Severance, and in third place was 2011 5A US National Chamption Samm Scott.

The judging system awarded Matsuura's tricks with a near-perfect score of 95.1, more than 20 points above the runner-up's score of 73.0.

AP 
Japan's SP!N NATION won the AP division with a Cops and Robbers themed yo-yo skit.

Participating nations
There are 33 countries currently registered with the IYYF that have the right to seed a National Champion into the semi-final round at the World Yo-Yo Contest. IYYF is also in communication with several other countries (denoted by *), but, currently, these countries do not have the right to seed a National Champion to the semi-finals.

Europe

 *
 *
 *
 *
 *
 *

North America

Asia

 *
 *
 *
 *
 *

Africa
 *
 *

South America 

 *
 *
 *

See also 

 List of yo-yo world champions

References

External links 
 World Yo-Yo Contest The World Yo-Yo Contest Web Site

Yo-yo competitions